The eastern trinket snake (Elaphe cantoris) is a species of snake in the family Colubridae. The species is endemic to South Asia.

Etymology
The specific name, cantoris, is in honor of Danish zoologist Theodore Edward Cantor.

Geographic range
E. cantoris is found in the Himalayas in Bhutan, India (Assam, Darjeeling, Sikkim), Myanmar, and Nepal. The type locality is the Khasi and Garo Hills in Meghalaya.

Habitat

Description
E. cantoris is a large species, and may grow to a total length (including tail) of almost . Dorsally, it has a brownish ground color, which is overlaid by a series of squarish dark brown blotches. Ventrally, it is yellowish anteriorly, becoming pinkish posteriorly.

Behavior
E. cantoris is partly arboreal.

Reproduction
E. cantoris is oviparous. In India, sexually mature females lay eggs in late July, with an average clutch size of 10 eggs.

References

Further reading
Boulenger GA (1894). Catalogue of the Snakes in the British Museum (Natural History). Volume II., Containing the Conclusion of the Colubridæ Aglyphæ. London: Trustees of the British Museum (Natural History). (Taylor and Francis, printers). xi + 382 pp. + Plates I-XX. (Coluber cantoris, new species, p. 35).
Chen X, Lemmon AR, Lemmon EM, Pyron RA, Burbrink FT (2017). "Using phylogenomics to understand the link between biogeographic origins and regional diversification in ratsnakes". Molecular Phylogenetics and Evolution 111: 206–218. (Elaphe cantoris).
Helfenberger, Notker; Shah, Karan B.; Orlov, Nicolai L.; Guex, Gaston-Denis (2000). "Eine seltene Natter aus Nepal, Elaphe cantoris (Boulenger, 1894) (Squamata: Serpentes: Colubridae) ". Sauria 22 (2): 3–10. (in German).
Smith MA (1943). The Fauna of British India, Ceylon and Burma, Including the Whole of the Indo-Chinese Sub-region. Reptilia and Amphibia. Vol. III.—Serpentes. London: Secretary of State for India. (Taylor and Francis, printers). xii + 583 pp. (Elaphe cantoris, new combination, pp. 152–153).
Wallach V (1997). "A monograph of the colubrid snakes of the genus Elaphe Fitzinger (book review)". Herpetological Review 28 (2): 110. (Gonyosoma cantoris, new combination).

Elaphe
Reptiles described in 1894
Taxa named by George Albert Boulenger
Reptiles of India
Reptiles of Bhutan
Reptiles of Nepal
Reptiles of Myanmar